Olga Kostyantynivna Kurylenko (born 14 November 1979) is a Ukrainian–French actress and model. She started her acting career in 2005, and first found success as an actress for her role as Nika Boronina in the film adaptation of the video game Hitman (2007). She is known as Bond girl Camille Montes in the 22nd James Bond film, Quantum of Solace (2008), and as Taskmaster in the superhero film Black Widow (2021).

She starred in Terrence Malick's To the Wonder (2012), Martin McDonagh's dark comedy Seven Psychopaths (2012), the Tom Cruise science fiction film Oblivion (2013), Armando Iannucci's political satire The Death of Stalin (2017), Terry Gilliam's The Man Who Killed Don Quixote (2018), and the Netflix series Treason (2022).

Early life
Kurylenko was born in Berdyansk, Ukrainian SSR, Soviet Union. Her father, Konstantin, is Ukrainian, and her mother, Marina Alyabusheva, who teaches art and is an exhibited artist, was born in Irkutsk Oblast, Russia, and is of Russian and Belarusian ancestry.

Her parents divorced when she was three and she was raised by her single mother. Kurylenko rarely had contact with her father, meeting him for the first time after the split when she was eight, and later when she was thirteen.

Career

Kurylenko moved from native Berdyansk to Moscow at 15. At the age of 16, she moved to Paris. In 1996, she signed a contract with the Paris-based Madison modelling agency where she met her publicist Valérie Rosen. The following year, by the age of 18, she had appeared on the covers of Vogue and Elle magazines. While working as a model in Paris, Kurylenko supported her mother in Ukraine.

She also appeared on the covers of Madame Figaro and Marie Claire magazines.
She became the face of brands Bebe, Clarins, and Helena Rubinstein. She has also modelled for Roberto Cavalli and Kenzo and appeared in the Victoria's Secret catalogue.

In 1998, she features in the music video of French-Algerian Raï style singer Faudel called "Tellement Je T'aime".

One of her first acting appearances was in Seal's music video, "Love's Divine" in 2003, but her film career truly began in France during 2005. She received the certificate of excellence award at the 2006 Brooklyn International Film Festival for her performance in L'Annulaire, and also starred in the Paris, je t'aime segment "Quartier de la Madeleine opposite Elijah Wood. That same year, she was selected to be the face of Kenzo's new fragrance, Kenzo Amour. She has appeared in all subsequent Kenzo Amour advertisements.

In 2007, she starred in Hitman alongside Timothy Olyphant. She had a minor role in Max Payne as Natasha. She played Bond girl Camille Montes in the 2008 James Bond film, Quantum of Solace (after beating out Gal Gadot in the auditions). In the film she plays the role of Bolivian Secret Service agent Camille Montes, who teams up with Bond to stop a terrorist organization and avenge the death of her parents.

She was featured on the cover of the December 2008 issue of the US edition of Maxim magazine and on the cover of the February 2009 issue of the Ukrainian edition of Maxim. In Ukraine the mayor of Berdyansk suggested naming a street after her in early 2008, and she and her mother met Ukraine's First Lady Kateryna Yushchenko in President Victor Yushchenko's family country house.

Kurylenko appeared in Terrence Malick's romantic drama film To the Wonder starring Ben Affleck and Rachel McAdams. The film was shot in the fall of 2010 in Bartlesville, Oklahoma. She also appeared in Oblivion, a science fiction film starring Tom Cruise and directed by Joseph Kosinski. Kurylenko played Alice Fournier in the spy thriller November Man. In 2014, Kurylenko starred in the historical drama film The Water Diviner alongside Russell Crowe (who made his directorial debut), Jacqueline McKenzie and Jai Courtney. She also played the headmistress in Vampire Academy. She later acted in films such as Momentum, Mara and The Bay of Silence.

In 2017, she appeared in Armando Iannucci's political satire film The Death of Stalin as the Soviet pianist Maria Yudina. The film was a critical success and starred Steve Buscemi, Simon Russell Beale, Jason Issacs, Michael Palin, and Jeffrey Tambor. The following year she starred in Terry Gilliam's epic adventure film The Man Who Killed Don Quixote (2018) starring Adam Driver and Jonathan Pryce where it premiered at the 2018 Cannes Film Festival. She also appeared as Baroness Roxane de Giverny in The Emperor of Paris, and as the Russian spy in the Rowan Atkinson led comedy film Johnny English Strikes Again (2018).

In 2021, she starred in the action thriller film Sentinelle. In the same year, she played Antonia Dreykov / Taskmaster in the Marvel Cinematic Universe (MCU) film Black Widow. In October, she was cast in comedy heist film High Heat alongside Don Johnson.

Personal life
Kurylenko acquired French citizenship in 2001, which she called "a practical decision" because it was easier to travel with a French passport without a visa, as opposed to travelling with a Ukrainian passport. She married French fashion photographer Cedric van Mol in 2000. The couple divorced four years later. She married American mobile phone accessory entrepreneur Damian Gabrielle in 2006; the marriage ended in divorce in late 2007. Kurylenko moved to London in 2009.

Kurylenko and her former partner, English actor and writer Max Benitz, have one sonwho was born in October 2015.

On 24 February 2022, during the Russian invasion of Ukraine, which is part of Russian-Ukrainian war, she expressed support for Ukraine.

Filmography

Film

Television

Video game

Awards and nominations

Notes

References

External links

1979 births
21st-century French actresses
French expatriates in England
French female models
French film actresses
French people of Belarusian descent
French people of Russian descent
French people of Ukrainian descent
Living people
Naturalized citizens of France
People from Berdiansk
Ukrainian emigrants to France
Ukrainian expatriates in England
Ukrainian female models
Ukrainian film actresses
Ukrainian people of Belarusian descent
Ukrainian people of Russian descent
21st-century Ukrainian actresses